National Chief  may refer to:

National Chief, a proposed Amtrak service involving the through-running of the Southwest Chief and Capitol Limited (Amtrak train)
National Chief, title of leader of the Assembly of First Nations

See also
National Chief Petty Officers Association
International Association of Chiefs of Police (formerly National Chiefs of Police Union)